Grigory Sergeyevich Smirnov (born 1 April 1997) is a Russian retired ice dancer who competed for the United States. With his former skating partner, Anastasia Shpilevaya, competing for Russia, he is the 2019 Bavarian Open champion, 2016 Youth Olympic champion, and 2017 Russian junior national champion.

During the 2021–22, he competes with Avonley Nguyen for the United States. He did not represent the US in international competition.

Personal life 
Grigory Sergeyevich Smirnov was born on 1 April 1997 in Nizhny Novgorod, Russia. He resides in Moscow.

Career

Early years 
Smirnov began learning to skate in 2002. He competed with Yulia Borisova in the 2010–11 season and with Valeria Neyman in 2011–12.

Smirnov teamed up with Anastasia Shpilevaya ahead of the 2012–13 season. Competing on the junior level, they placed fifth at the Ice Challenge and won silver at the Pavel Roman Memorial. The following season, they qualified for the 2014 Russian Junior Championships, where they finished seventh.

2014–2015 season 
Shpilevaya/Smirnov received their first ISU Junior Grand Prix (JGP) assignments in the 2014–15 season. They won bronze in late August at the JGP in Courchevel, France, but finished ninth the following month in Tallinn, Estonia. The two placed fifth at the 2015 Russian Junior Championships.

2015–2016 season 
Shpilevaya/Smirnov's first event of the 2015 JGP series took place in October in Logroño, Spain. They finished fourth, outscored for the bronze medal by Elliana Pogrebinsky / Alex Benoit, resulting in the loss of their provisional assignment to Zagreb, Croatia. In January 2016, they won the bronze medal at the Russian Junior Championships, behind Alla Loboda / Pavel Drozd and Betina Popova / Yuri Vlasenko. They were named in Russia's teams to the Youth Olympics and World Junior Championships.

In February, Shpilevaya/Smirnov won gold at the 2016 Winter Youth Olympics in Hamar, Norway, having placed first in both segments. Assigned to Team Courage for the mixed NOC team event, they placed first in their segment and their team finished sixth. On March 15–20, they competed at the 2016 World Junior Championships in Debrecen, Hungary where they finished fifth.

2016–2017 season 
In the 2016–17 Season, Shpilevaya/Smirnov's first JGP assignment was at the 2016 JGP Japan where they won the silver medal with a total score of 151.50 points. A month later they achieved their second silver of the season at the 2016 JGP Germany. With two silver medals they qualified for the 2016−17 JGP Final where they placed sixth.

In February 2017 Shpilevaya/Smirnov won the gold medal at the 2017 Russian Junior Championships after placing second in the short dance and 1st in the free dance. They beat the silver medalist and the favourites, Alla Loboda / Pavel Drozd, by almost 6 points, mainly due to the costly fall that Lododa had in the free dance.

In March 2017 they competed at the 2017 World Junior Championships where they finished fourth after placing fourth in both the short dance and free dance. At these championships they scored their personal best score of 152.66 points.

2017–2018 season 
In the 2017–18 Season, Shpilevaya/Smirnov's first JGP assignment was at the 2016 JGP Latvia where they won the silver medal behind their teammates and training partners, Sofia Shevchenko / Igor Eremenko. Due to Smirnov's injury, which required a surgery, they had to skip the rest of the season.

2018–2019 season 
Shpilevaya/Smirnov started their season by competing in two ISU Challenger Series events. In early October they made their international senior debut at the 2018 CS Finlandia Trophy where they finished fifth and in mid-November, they competed at the 2018 CS Alpen Trophy where they placed fourth.  They placed sixth at the 2019 Russian Championships.

2019–2020 & 2020–2021 seasons 
Beginning the season with two Challenger assignments, Shpilevaya/Smirnov placed fourth at 2019 CS Lombardia Trophy and then sixth at 2019 CS Finlandia Trophy. Making their Grand Prix debut, they placed sixth at the 2019 Rostelecom Cup. At the 2020 Russian Championships, they placed ninth.

In September 2020, it was announced that the pair had split due to Shpilevaya's inability to practice due to the lasting effects of a severe case of COVID-19.

2021–2022 season 
In September 2021, it was confirmed that Smirnov had switched federations to compete with American ice dancer Avonley Nguyen for the United States after Shpilevaya was forced to end her career. They were scheduled to make their U.S. Championship debut in January 2022, but withdrew after Smirnov suffered a hip injury.

On August 20, 2022, Smirnov announced he had retired and was now coaching.

Programs

With Nguyen

With Shpilevaya

Competitive highlights 
GP: Grand Prix; CS: Challenger Series; JGP: Junior Grand Prix

With Nguyen for United States

With Shpilevaya for Russia

With Neyman for Russia

Detailed results 

With Shpilevaya

References

External links 
 
 

1997 births
Russian male ice dancers
Living people
Sportspeople from Nizhny Novgorod
Figure skaters at the 2016 Winter Youth Olympics
Youth Olympic gold medalists for Russia
Competitors at the 2019 Winter Universiade